Joséphine s'arrondit (literally, Joséphine gets rounder) is a 2016 French romantic comedy film directed by Marilou Berry. It is the sequel to the 2013 film Joséphine.

Plot
Joséphine finally found her "perfect-man-non-smoking-good-cook-who-love-cats"! Her life is perfect... 'til she discovers that she's pregnant. Lots of new hardships await her: new responsibilities, her "depressed-has-been-living-with-her-for-two-years" sister, to find a job, how to keep her guy, not mess up with her friends…

Cast

 Marilou Berry as Joséphine
 Mehdi Nebbou as Gilles
 Sarah Suco as Sophie
 Cyril Guei as Cyril
 Medi Sadoun as Marc
 Bérengère Krief as Chloé
 Josiane Balasko as Joséphine's mother
 Patrick Braoudé as Joséphine's father
 Vanessa Guide as Diane
 Victoria Abril as Gilles's mother
 Caroline Anglade as Alexandra
 Catherine Jacob as Anne de Bauvallet
 Zahia Dehar as Lola
 Lise Lamétrie as The crèche manager

Production
The film was shot in June and July 2015. It was first shown on 15 January 2016 at the "Festival International du Film de l'Alpe d'Huez" ("International Festival of film of l'Alpe d'Huez") before the general release in France on 10 February 2016.

The film is the debut of Marilou Berry as a director. Berry's real-life mother Josiane Balasko played her mother in the film.

References

External links

2016 romantic comedy films
2016 films
Films based on French comics
Films directed by Marilou Berry
French romantic comedy films
French sequel films
Live-action films based on comics
French pregnancy films
2016 directorial debut films
2010s pregnancy films
2010s French films